Kondaveedu Fort is a historically significant ancient hill fortress located in Kondaveedu, a village in the Chilakaluripet constituency of Palnadu district, Andhra Pradesh, India. The site is located 16 miles west of the city of Guntur. Apart from this main fort, there are two other forts (names not known) nearby. Efforts are in progress to classify Kondaveedu Fort as a UNESCO World Heritage Site.

Kondaveedu Fort was constructed by Prolaya Vema Reddi. It was used as the capital by the Reddi dynasty between 1328 and 1482, shifting from their former capital at Addanki. It was taken by the Vijayanagara emperor Krishnadevaraya in 1516. The Golconda Sultans fought for the fort in 1531, 1536 and 1579, and Sultan Quli Qutb Shah finally captured it in 1579, renaming it Murtazanagar.

The fort came under the control of the French colonists in 1752 when it was extensively fortified. It passed on to the British East India Company who got control of the fort in 1788 but abandoned it in the early 19th century in favour of Guntur. Now, the massive fortifications and battlements are seen in ruins only. The interior has extensive ruins of magazines and storehouses.

Geography
There are two hill (ghat) sections, which form the hill ranges, one is to the north, which provides a very steep but short access to the forts. The preferred access is more circuitous and less tiring and involves  of trekking. Kondaveedu and the surrounding forest areas have a large number of Custard apple (Morinda citrifolia (Noni)) trees.

History

The village of Kondavidu is said to have been established in 1115 CE as a fortified township by Gopanna, a commander of Buddhavarma of the Telugu Choda dynasty. Later it came under the Kakatiyas and occupied by Prolaya Vema Reddi who shifted his capital from Addanki to Kondaveedu. Later, the fort was under the control of Vijayanagar Kings, Gajapatis, Golkonda sultans and lastly under the French and British.

In 1323, Warangal and the whole of Andhra Pradesh came under the reign of Tughlaqs rulers of Delhi. Their depredations and despotic reign resulted in the formation of a confederation movement by the Hindu Musunuri Nayaks, who ousted the Muslims from Warangal, and the Reddys were part of this movement.

The Reddys of Kondaveedu were initially feudatories of the kings of Warangal. From inscriptions, it is inferred that their rule overlapped with that of the Korukonda Reddis and that they shifted from their earlier capital at Addanki in Guntur to Kondaveedu. The founder of the dynasty was Prolaya Vema Reddy, the son of Prola. They ruled in the region around present-day Vijayawada and Guntur towns for nearly a hundred years (1328–1428). Their first ruler Prolaya Vema Reddy (followed by five other rulers till 1428) who ruled till 1353, strengthened the defenses of his kingdom by building a number of forts, which included the Kondaveedu Fort. He shifted his capital from Addanki in Guntur to Kondaveedu fort. Subsequently, the region was ruled by the Bahmanis (1458), the Vijayanagara kings (1516), the Qutb Shahis, (1531,1537 & 1579), the Mughal army of Aurangzeb in 1687, the French (1752), the Asaf Jahi Kings, and finally the British (1766 and 1788).

Early in 2019, remains of a Buddhist stupa were found under a dilapidated Hindu temple at Kondaveedu fort. The remains date back to the later Satavahana period — 1st to 2nd century CE. This discovery pushes back of the history of Kondaveedu to the Satavahana period.

Three copper plate grants of Prithvi Sri Mularaja were found in Kondavidu.

Structure
The three forts on top of the narrow hill range are now in ruins; the earliest-built fort dates to the 12th century. Its fortifications built with granite stones comprise huge ramparts, magazines, warehouses, granaries, and wells. There are two entry gates into the forts, called the ‘Kolepalli Darwaza’ and the ‘Nadella Darwaza’. The entrance gate is three-storied, massive and made of granite stone blocks. A defense bunker is also seen. The source of water supply to the inhabitants of the fort was from three sources namely, the Mutyalama Cheruvu, the Puttalamma Cheruvu and the Vedulla Cheruvu (‘Cheruvu’ in Telugu language means "pond"). On the way to the fort at Kothapalem (known as Puttakota in the past), at the foothill of the fort, an embankment is seen which is inferred as a security ring bund to protect the royal family palaces and houses of the main functionaries of the fort.

The fort's ruins on the southwest side of the Kondaveedu village is in the shape of an equilateral triangle, and at the turning angles of the triangle at the south west and north east, tower bastions are provided, which form part of the façade wall of the fort. A single wall of  length straddles the hills.

A temple known as the Gopinathaswami temple (dedicated to Lord Krishna) lies at the foot of the hill; its bunched stone pillars are carved out of a single rock. Both Hindu and Muslim architectural styles are seen in the forts. A mosque is also located within the fort.

Restoration works
The department of Archaeology and Museums (Andhra Pradesh) has decided to carry out major development and restoration works to bring out the past glory of the forts. The works proposed involve construction of hill (ghat) road of  length from the eastern side of the hill (the first step to approach the forts to begin restoration works), resetting and providing railing along the rocky pathway, and improving the view-points, bastions, garrison barracks, stables and internal roads with appropriate tourist signages.

ISKCON South India is also embarking on giving a major face-lift to this historical fort through their Spiritual Heritage Revival Project. The Andhra Pradesh government has sanctioned a  plot at the foot of the hill to build a beautiful temple for the ancient Venna Gopal deity at the foot of the Kondaveedu Hills in the first phase. The deity was originally installed 500 years ago by the great South Indian Emperor Krishnadevaraya, who also took over the Fort from its previous rulers, the Reddy Kings(Reddy dynasty).

And provided this first phase is carried out successfully, the AP Government promised ISKCON another  at the top of the hill to develop. A 3 Crore (30 million rupee) road to the top of the hill is already being completed by Andhra Pradesh government. Krishnas Idol is very rare in the world. Below is the picture of Krishna located in Cheghizkhan pet (Kondaveedu)

Access
Kondaveedu Fort is situated in Kondaveedu village west of Guntur City. Guntur is easily accessible by road and rail from all parts of India. After reaching Guntur one should board a Guntur-Chilakaluripet ordinary bus and alight at Bhoyapalem-Pirangipuram Road and can hire an auto rickshaw to the fort.

The simplest way to reach the fort by one's own vehicle. Reach Guntur or Chilakaluripet by road. Drive 25 km from Guntur towards Chilakaluripet via NH5 vice verse 13 km from Chilakaluripet and turn towards Bhoyapalem-Pirangipuram Road. In this road we need to travel around 10 km to our destination.

References

Citations

Sources

External links

Video clip of Kondaveedu-Golden age of Telugu Kingdom(Reddy Kings), Best Tourism place in India

Buildings and structures in Guntur district
Forts in Andhra Pradesh
Tourist attractions in Guntur district
13th-century establishments in India
Monuments of National Importance in Andhra Pradesh
Vijayanagara Empire
Archaeological sites in Andhra Pradesh
Buildings and structures completed in the 13th century